"Take It Like a Man" is a 1975 song written by Fred Turner and Blair Thornton, and first recorded by Canadian rock group Bachman–Turner Overdrive (BTO) for their December, 1975 album Head On. The lead vocal is provided by Turner. Released in January 1976, it was the first and more successful of two singles issued from the LP, the second being the jazzy "Lookin' Out for #1", which missed the U.S. Top 40 but gained some airplay on soft rock stations. "Take It Like a Man" was the sixth and last single by BTO to reach the Top 40 on the U.S. Billboard Hot 100, peaking at No. 33 on March 13, 1976. On the Canadian RPM charts, it reached the No. 24 position.

Background
"Take It Like a Man" features a prominent piano accompaniment played by pioneering rocker Little Richard, including a piano solo that closes the song. Just before the solo starts, Fred Turner can be heard shouting, “Play it, Richard!"  Little Richard also played piano on the Head On song “Stay Alive”, which was not released as a single.

Reception
Cash Box said it's "an excellent tune, and with a fat rhythm section" and with "some great rifting from the guitars, a soulful vocal, and a little rag-rock piano." Record World said that "this tune stands up to the best [the band has] done."

Charts

References

1975 songs
1976 singles
Bachman–Turner Overdrive songs
Mercury Records singles
Songs written by Fred Turner (musician)